Election to Kolazhy Grama Panchayat was held on 10 December 2020 as part of Local Body Elections, Kerala.Counting was held on 16 December 2020. LDF secured majority by winning 12 out of 17 seats in the panchayath.

Results(Summary)

By Alliance

Winning Candidates

Results(Detailed)

Ward 1 ( Kunnathupeetika )

Ward 2 ( Attore North )

Ward 3 ( Pottore North )

Ward 4 ( Thiroor )

Ward 5 (Puthan Madham Kunnu)

Ward 6 (Athekkad)

Ward 7 (Kolazhy North)

Ward 8 (Kolazhy)

Ward 9 (Poovani)

Ward 10 (Kolazhy West)

Ward 11 (Pottore South)

Ward 12 (Attore South)

Ward 13 (Pambur)

Ward 14 (Kuttoor East)

Ward 15 (Kuttoor West)

Ward 16 (Kuttoor North)

Ward 17 (Kottekkad)

References 

Kolazhy Grama Panchayat
2020 Kerala local body elections